Sally M. Benson is a professor of energy engineering at Stanford University. In 2014, she was appointed as director of the Precourt Institute for Energy, the university's hub of energy research and education.  Benson will continue on as director of Stanford's Global Climate and Energy Project (GCEP), a position she has had since 2007.

On November 24, 2021, Benson was appointed to the White House's Office of Science and Technology Policy as deputy director for Energy and Chief Strategist for the Energy Transition.

Biography
Benson received a B.S. in geology from Barnard College of Columbia University, and a Ph.D. in materials and mineral engineering from the University of California-Berkeley.

Benson has held several positions with the Lawrence Berkeley National Laboratory, Berkeley, California. These include 1980–2007, Staff scientist (director 1993–1997), Earth Sciences Division; 2001–2004, deputy director for operations; 1997–2001, Associate laboratory director, Energy Sciences.

Awards and honours
Benson has won various awards, including the 2012 Greenman Award, Michel T. Halbouty Distinguished Lecture Award from the Geological Society, and the ARCS American Pacesetter Award.

See also

Mark Z. Jacobson
Tom Steyer
Lee Schipper
Al Gore
Hermann Scheer
Benjamin K. Sovacool
John A. "Skip" Laitner
Amory Lovins
Daniel Kammen
Renewable energy commercialization

References

External links
Precourt Institute for Energy

21st-century American women
21st-century women engineers
American women engineers
Barnard College alumni
Energy policy
Living people
Energy engineers
Stanford University faculty
American environmentalists
UC Berkeley College of Engineering alumni
Year of birth missing (living people)
Office of Science and Technology Policy officials
Biden administration personnel